Lee Seon-hwa (Korean 이선화) (born 10 February 1986) is a South Korean professional golfer now playing on the United States LPGA Tour.

Born in Cheonan, South Korea, Lee began playing golf at age 4 and turned professional at age 14, the youngest female to ever turn professional in Korea. She recorded three wins on the LPGA of Korea Tour between 2001 and 2006. She played on the Futures Tour in 2004 and 2005 before joining the LPGA Tour in 2006. She won her first LPGA tournament in June 2006 at the ShopRite LPGA Classic.

In 2006, Lee won the LPGA Rookie of the Year award. She clinched the award on 25 September 2006 after competing in 24 tournaments and finishing in the top 10 six times, including one win. She was the first rookie to win on Tour in 2006.

In 2007, she notched her second LPGA Tour win at the HSBC Women's World Match Play Championship, defeating Japanese star Ai Miyazato 2&1 in the final match, to take home the $500,000 first place check.

Professional wins (8)

LPGA Tour (4)

LPGA Tour playoff record (1–1)

Futures Tour (1)
2005 (1) Albany FUTURES Pro Golf Classic

Korean LPGA Tour (3)
2001 (1) McSquare Championship
2003 (1) Himart Championship
2006 (1) Hite Championship

Results in LPGA majors

^ The Evian Championship was added as a major in 2013.

CUT = missed the half-way cut
WD = withdrew
"T" = tied

Team appearances
Professional
Lexus Cup (representing Asia team): 2006 (winners), 2007 (winners), 2008

References

External links

South Korean female golfers
LPGA of Korea Tour golfers
LPGA Tour golfers
South Korean Buddhists
Sportspeople from South Chungcheong Province
People from Cheonan
1986 births
Living people